Branklyn Garden is a hillside public garden in the Kinnoull area of the Scottish city of Perth.

A National Trust for Scotland site, the garden was established in 1922 by John and Dorothy Renton, who built a house on the property. The couple's desire was to have a garden that featured rare and unusual plants, along with flowers from all over the world. Several people, including George Forrest and Frank Ludlow, collected seeds for the garden, which now has over 3,500 species of plants. Today, the garden is also home to several national collections of plants, including Meconopsis and Cassiope.

References

External links 

Gardens in Perth and Kinross
Tourist attractions in Perth, Scotland
National Trust for Scotland properties
1922 establishments in Scotland